Shades of the Heart is a 2019 South Korean drama film written and directed by Kim Jong-kwan, and starring Yeon Woo-jin, Lee Ji-eun, Yoon Hye-ri, Kim Sang-ho and Lee Joo-young.

Plot
After getting divorced overseas, a novelist Chang-seok returns to Korea and readies to publish a novel based on his own life experience. He then meets the aimless Mi-young at a cafe located inside a bustling subway station in Euljiro who recollects her meeting with him and their past together. Chang-seok also meets his editor, Yoo-jin, who shares a leftover cigarette with him and thinks about her past. Next, he accidentally runs into a photographer Sung-ha who's taking care of his ailing wife. Last, Chang-seok shares a conversation with bartender Joo-eun, who tries to remember her memories from her patrons lost after a car accident.

Upon meeting each others, they explore slightly different themes, but each is connected with a shared feeling of loss and insecurity as each character struggles to remain sane in a society that evokes feelings of existential dread. This marks Chang-seok and changes his feelings and mind, also making him choose to begin writing yet another new story.

Cast
Yeon Woo-jin as Chang-seok (창석)
Rich and realistic, he has a placid voice and expressive eyes. He hides his sadness underneath a prosaic exterior. However, the extent of grief over his divorce and the death of their child becomes increasingly visible, and many of his encounters reveal other achingly human stories of loss.
Lee Ji-eun as Mi-young (미영)
Trapped between illusion and reality, Mi-young is aimless and loves solitude, but she always welcomes friendships.
Yoon Hye-ri as Yoo-jin (유진)
A woman who speaks very plainly about her past. She is Chang-seok's editor.
Kim Sang-ho as Sung-ha (성하)
Lee Joo-young as Joo-eun (주은)
Moon Sook as Chang-seok's mother
Jang Hae-min
Kim Keum-soon

References

External links
 
 
 Shades of the Heart at Daum Movie 
 Shades of the Heart at Rakuten Viki
 Shades of the Heart at Letterboxd

2019 films
2019 drama films
2010s Korean-language films
2010s South Korean films
South Korean drama films